Francis Wemyss Charteris, Lord Elcho (31 January 1749 – 20 January 1808) was a Scottish nobleman and member of parliament.

Life
He was the only son of Francis Charteris, second son of James Wemyss, 5th Earl of Wemyss. The fifth Earl's eldest son David Wemyss, Lord Elcho had been attainted for his part in the Jacobite Rising of 1745 so after the Earl's death in 1756 the earldom became forfeit.

Charteris was elected to Parliament for the Haddington district of burghs in 1780. From 1784 he was in opposition to the government of William Pitt the Younger.

In 1787 Charteris' uncle Lord Elcho (who but for his attainder would have been 6th Earl of Wemyss) died. As Charteris' father had not been attainted himself, he assumed the title as 7th Earl of Wemyss, with Charteris himself assuming the subsidiary title Lord Elcho. At the time eldest sons of Scottish peers were not allowed to represent Scottish constituencies in Parliament, and after a debate on the matter Charteris had to vacate his seat. Although it was later established that the Earldom of Wemyss remained forfeit and his father was not after all a Scottish peer, Charteris did not attempt to re-enter Parliament.

Charteris died on 20 January 1808 at Amisfield House, East Lothian, and was interred at St Mary's Collegiate Church, Haddington.

Marriage and issue
Francis Charteris married in 1771 Susan, daughter of Anthony Keck and granddaughter of James Hamilton, 4th Duke of Hamilton. They had one son and four daughters:
 Francis, who obtained a reversal of the attainder and became 8th Earl of Wemyss
 Henrietta Charlotte Elizabeth, who married George Harry Grey, 6th Earl of Stamford
 Susan, who married Sir Henry Clinton
 Katharine, who married Edward Richard Stewart
 Augusta, who married Warner William Westenra, 2nd Baron Rossmore.

In 1818—after Francis Chateris's death—his widow Susan Chateris (by then the Dowager Lady Elcho) changed her surname to Tracy as a condition of inheriting her uncle Robert Tracy's estate, on the death of her elder sister.

References

 Edith Lady Haden-Guest, CHARTERIS, Francis (1749-1808), of Amisfield, Haddington and Hornby, Lancs., The History of Parliament. Accessed 24 November 2011.
 Patrick Cracroft-Brennan, Wemyss, Earl of (S, 1633), Cracroft's Peerage. Accessed 24 November 2011.

1749 births
1808 deaths
Members of the Parliament of Great Britain for Scottish constituencies
British MPs 1774–1780
British MPs 1780–1784
British MPs 1784–1790
Heirs apparent who never acceded
Francis
British courtesy barons and lords of Parliament